The Woven Stories of the Other (original title: Huling Balyan ng Buhi meaning "the last priestess of life" in the local language of Mindanao) is a 2006 Philippine indie film directed by Sherad Anthony Sanchez.

Plot
A story about an intertribal war and the threat of extinction to the Buhi tribe and its over-protective Balyan (shaman) of the Arakan Valley, North Cotabato, Mindanao.

Cast
 Marilyn Roque as Unang Balyan
 Jeliete Ruca as Gigi
 Ronald Arguelles as rebel

Awards and nominations

References

External links

2006 films
Philippine musical drama films